Eilean Hoan is an island in Loch Eriboll in Sutherland on the north coast of Scotland. Its name is of Gaelic and Old Norse derivation and means "haven island".

The island was last inhabited in the early 19th century and the Ordnance Survey indicate the presence of a ruined croft. It is now a nature reserve. Eilean Hoan is located at the northern, seaward end of the loch and there are various small islets in the vicinity including A' Ghoil-sgeir, An Cruachan, An Dubh-sgeir, Eilean Clùimhrig, and Pocan Smoo.

Further south, and deeper into the loch is Eilean Choraidh.

References

Notes

Islands of Sutherland
Former populated places in Scotland
Uninhabited islands of Highland (council area)